An enthesopathy refers to a disorder involving the attachment of a tendon or ligament to a bone. This site of attachment is known as the enthesis (pl. entheses).
If the condition is known to be inflammatory, it can more precisely be called an enthesitis.

Forms 

Enthesopathy can occur at the shoulder, elbow, wrist, carpus, hip, knee, ankle, tarsus, or heel bone, among other regions. Enthesopathies may take the form of spondyloarthropathies (joint diseases of the spine) such as ankylosing spondylitis, plantar fasciitis, and Achilles tendinitis. Further examples include:
 Adhesive capsulitis of shoulder
 Rotator cuff syndrome of shoulder and allied disorders
 Periarthritis of shoulder
 Scapulohumeral fibrositis
 Synovitis of hand or wrist
 Periarthritis of wrist
 Gluteal tendinitis
 Iliac crest spur
 Psoas tendinitis
 Trochanteric tendinitis

Causes
Generalized involvement of the entheses with calcification of tendon and ligament insertions and of joint capsules has been found for example in people with X-linked hypophosphatemic rickets.

Diagnosis

Mainly by clinical examination and provocative tests by counter acting the muscle action.

Treatment

The natural history of the two most common enthesopathies (plantar fasciitis and lateral epicondylitis-both mislabeled as inflammatory) is resolution over a period of about 1 year without treatment. 

There are no known disease-modifying treatments for these enthesopathies. In other words, there is no experimental evidence that any treatment can alter the pathophysiology (mucoid degeneration) or the duration of symptoms. There is no evidence that activity modification alters the natural history of the disease.

To date, all treatments are palliative. The evidence suggests that most treatments have non-specific effects (e.g. placebo effect, regression to the mean, self-limiting course of symptoms).

Injection of corticosteroid, platelet-rich plasma, or stem cells are examples of treatments that are not supported by experimental evidence and remain open to debate. Extracorporeal shockwave therapy is also in that category. 

Palliative treatments consist of stretching, analgesics, and padding (e.g. cushioned foot wear for plantar fasciitis), splints (e.g. tennis elbow strap), and other treatments. The concept that a calcified attachment can be removed surgically is highly debatable as these calcifications are a regular part of an enthesopathy.

References

External links 

Musculoskeletal disorders